Max James (born 27 December 1951) is a former Australian rules footballer who played for Port Adelaide in the South Australian National Football League (SANFL). He also spent 5 years in the Victorian Football League (VFL) playing for South Melbourne.

Port Adelaide (1971–1977) 
James started out at Port Adelaide in 1971 and was a member of their 1977 premiership team. James represented South Australia in eight interstate matches, including at the 1975 Knockout Carnival. In 1977 he was awarded a Simpson Medal for his performance in a match against Western Australia.

South Melbourne (1978–1982) 
James transferred to South Melbourne and made his VFL debut in the opening round of the 1978 VFL season. Known for his high flying marks, most of James's games were played from centre half forward, but he was used in various others positions during an injury-riddled stint in the league.

When South Melbourne relocated to Sydney for the 1982 VFL season, James joined them in the move but could only manage three appearances. His son Heath James would later play for the Sydney Swans.

Port Adelaide (1982–1985) 
James returned to Port Adelaide to finish his career.

Political career 
James ran as an independent candidate at the 2010 South Australian state election in the House of Assembly seat of Port Adelaide held by Rann Labor Treasurer Kevin Foley. In a candidate field of five, James came third receiving 11 percent of the vote.

References

Holmesby, Russell and Main, Jim (2007). The Encyclopedia of AFL Footballers. 7th ed. Melbourne: Bas Publishing.

1951 births
Living people
Australian rules footballers from South Australia
Sydney Swans players
Port Adelaide Football Club (SANFL) players
Port Adelaide Football Club players (all competitions)
South Australian State of Origin players